Queen of Darkness or variants may refer to:

Queen of the Darkness (2000), a horror novel by Anne Bishop
"Enter Merla: Queen of Darkness", a 1985 episode of Voltron
"Queen of Darkness", a song by Tony Banks from Bankstatement (album)
"Queen of Darkness", a song by Badfinger from Head First (Badfinger album)
"Queen of Darkness" (2006), a song by Shonen Knife from Genki Shock!
Eclipsa, Queen of Darkness, a character in the television series Star vs. the Forces of Evil
Takhisis, a fictional goddess of evil in the Dragonlance setting.

See also
 Queen of Air and Darkness (disambiguation)